Jasper Junior Senior High School (JHS) is a public high school located in Jasper, Alberta, Canada.

Building
The school is housed in a building of masonry construction that was first made erect in 1952.

References

External links
Official site

High schools in Alberta
Jasper, Alberta
Educational institutions established in 1952
1952 establishments in Alberta